The Bishop of Ramsbury is an episcopal title used by a suffragan bishop of the Church of England Diocese of Salisbury, in the Province of Canterbury, England. The title takes its name from the village of Ramsbury in Wiltshire, and was first used between the 10th and 11th centuries by the Anglo-Saxon Bishops of Ramsbury; the modern See was erected under the Suffragans Nomination Act 1888 by Order in Council dated 24 October 1973. From the establishment of the Salisbury area scheme in 1981 until its abolition in 2009, the bishops suffragan of Ramsbury were area bishops. The bishop oversees the Wiltshire parts of the diocese, i.e. the Archdeaconries of Sarum and Wiltshire.

The diocese announced in August 2011 that the Bishop of Salisbury had commissioned (under new national guidelines) a consultation as to whether a new Bishop of Ramsbury should be appointed.

Modern bishops suffragan

References

External links
 Crockford's Clerical Directory - Listings

Ramsbury